In mathematics, the slow manifold of an equilibrium point of a dynamical system occurs as the most common example of a center manifold.  One of the main methods of simplifying dynamical systems, is to reduce the dimension of the system to that of the slow manifold—center manifold theory rigorously justifies the modelling.  For example, some global and regional models of the atmosphere or oceans resolve the so-called quasi-geostrophic flow dynamics on the slow manifold of the atmosphere/oceanic dynamics,
and is thus crucial to forecasting with a climate model.

In some cases, a slow manifold is defined to be the invariant manifold on which the dynamics are slow compared to the dynamics off the manifold. The slow manifold in a particular problem would be a sub-manifold of either the stable, unstable, or center manifold, exclusively, that has the same dimension of, and is tangent to, the eigenspace with an associated eigenvalue (or eigenvalue pair) that has the smallest real part in magnitude. This generalizes the definition described in the first paragraph. Furthermore, one might define the slow manifold to be tangent to more than one eigenspace by choosing a cut-off point in an ordering of the real part eigenvalues in magnitude from least to greatest. In practice, one should be careful to see what definition the literature is suggesting.

Definition
Consider the dynamical system

for an evolving state vector  and with equilibrium point . Then the linearization of the system at the equilibrium point is

The matrix  defines four invariant subspaces characterized by the eigenvalues  of the matrix: as described in the entry for the center manifold three of the subspaces are the stable, unstable and center subspaces corresponding to the span of the eigenvectors with eigenvalues  that have real part negative, positive, and zero, respectively; the fourth subspace is the slow subspace given by the span of the eigenvectors, and generalized eigenvectors, corresponding to the eigenvalue  precisely (more generally, corresponding to all eigenvalues with  separated by a gap from all other eigenvalues, those with ).  The slow subspace is a subspace of the center subspace, or identical to it, or possibly empty.

Correspondingly, the nonlinear system has invariant manifolds, made of trajectories of the nonlinear system, corresponding to each of these invariant subspaces. There is an invariant manifold tangent to the slow subspace and with the same dimension; this manifold is the slow manifold.

Stochastic slow manifolds also exist for noisy dynamical systems (stochastic differential equation), as do also stochastic center, stable and unstable manifolds.  Such stochastic slow manifolds are similarly useful in modeling emergent stochastic dynamics, but there are many fascinating issues to resolve such as history and future dependent integrals of the noise.

Examples

Simple case with two variables 
The coupled system in two variables  and 

Apart from exponentially decaying transients, this slow manifold and its evolution captures all solutions that are in the neighborhood of the origin. The neighborhood of attraction is, roughly, at least the half-space .

Slow dynamics among fast waves
Edward Norton Lorenz introduced the following dynamical system of five equations in five variables to explore the notion of a slow manifold of quasi-geostrophic flow

Linearized about the origin the eigenvalue zero has multiplicity three, and there is a complex conjugate pair of eigenvalues, . Lorenz later argued a slow manifold did not exist! But normal form arguments suggest that there is a dynamical system that is exponentially close to the Lorenz system for which there is a good slow manifold.

Eliminate an infinity of variables
In modeling we aim to simplify enormously.   This example uses a slow manifold to simplify the 'infinite dimensional' dynamics of a partial differential equation to a model of one ordinary differential equation.  Consider a field  undergoing the nonlinear diffusion

with Robin boundary conditions

Parametrising the boundary conditions by  empowers us to cover the insulating Neumann boundary condition case , the Dirichlet boundary condition case , and all cases between.

Now for a marvelous trick, much used in exploring dynamics with bifurcation theory.  Since parameter  is constant, adjoin the trivially true differential equation

Without going into details, about each and every equilibria the linearized diffusion has two zero eigenvalues and for  all the rest are negative (less than ). Thus the two-dimensional dynamics on the slow manifolds emerge (see emergence) from the nonlinear diffusion no matter how complicated the initial conditions.

Here one can straightforwardly verify the slow manifold to be precisely the field  where amplitude  evolves according to

That is, after the initial transients that by diffusion smooth internal structures, the emergent behavior is one of relatively slow decay of the amplitude at a rate controlled by the type of boundary condition (constant ).

We cannot yet be sure how large  may be taken, but the theory assures us the results do hold for some finite parameter .

Perhaps the simplest nontrivial stochastic slow manifold
Stochastic modeling is much more complicated—this example illustrates just one such complication.  Consider for small parameter  the two variable dynamics of this linear system forced with noise from the random walk :

One could simply notice that the Ornstein–Uhlenbeck process  is formally the history integral

 

and then assert that  is simply the integral of this history integral.

Alternatively, a stochastic coordinate transform extracts a sound model for the long term dynamics.  Change variables to  where

then the new variables evolve according to the simple

In these new coordinates we readily deduce  exponentially quickly, leaving  undergoing a random walk to be the long term model of the stochastic dynamics on the stochastic slow manifold obtained by setting .

A web service constructs such slow manifolds in finite dimensions, both deterministic and stochastic.

See also
Quasi-geostrophic equations

References

Dynamical systems